is a Japanese gymnast. She competed at the 1972 Summer Olympics.

References

External links
 

1954 births
Living people
Japanese female artistic gymnasts
Olympic gymnasts of Japan
Gymnasts at the 1972 Summer Olympics
Place of birth missing (living people)